Charles A. McClenahan (February 7, 1941 – May 11, 2017) was a member of the Maryland House of Delegates for District 38, which covers Somerset, Wicomico, & Worcester Counties.

Background
Delegate McClenahan was appointed to the Maryland House of Delegates to replace J. Lowell Stoltzfus who was appointed to the Maryland State Senate.  He was defeated in the 2002 primary election by D. Page Elmore. He died on May 11, 2017 at the age of 76.

Education
He attended Crisfield High School in Crisfield, Maryland, which is in Somerset County, Maryland.

Career
Prior to joining the Maryland House of Delegates, McClenahan was a project director for the Somerset County Community Action Agency from 1966 until 1976. Since 1979, he has been a partner and chair of Landmark Insurance, Inc.

In addition to his career, Delegate McClenahan is also active in many organizations, including being a member of the board of directors for the Lower Shore Sheltered Workshop from 1971 until 1978, the J. Millard Tawes Foundation since 1980, and the United Way of the Lower Eastern Shore since 1986.  McClenahan was also the chair of the Committee to Build Somerset County Public Golf Course, a member of the Lower Eastern Shore Mayors' Association, the Crisfield Area Chamber of Commerce, the Salisbury State University Foundation, and the Tangier Sound Music Festival. He was also a member of the Delmarva Water Transport Committee, and the Delmarva Industrial Developers Association.

In the legislature
During Delegate McClenahan's tenure in the Maryland General Assembly, he served on the Economic Matters Committee, the Joint Committee on Health Care Delivery and Financing, the Joint Committee on Protocol, and the Joint Committee on Administrative, Executive and Legislative Review.  He was also the chair of the Somerset County Delegation and the vice-chair of the Eastern Shore Delegation.

Election results
2002 Primary Race for Maryland House of Delegates – District 38A
Voters to choose one:
{| class="wikitable"
|-
!Name
!Votes
!Percent
!Outcome
|-
|D. Page Elmore, Rep.
|1,909
|  61%
|   Won
|-
|Charles A. McClenahan, Rep.
|1,223
|  39%
|   Lost
|}

1998 Race for Maryland House of Delegates – District 38
Voters to choose one for Somerset County:
{| class="wikitable"
|-
!Name
!Votes
!Percent
!Outcome
|-
|Charles A. McClenahan, Rep.
|17,112
|  52%
|   Won
|-
|Ernest J. Leatherbury Sr., Dem.
|15,711
|  48%
|   Lost
|}

1998 Race for Maryland House of Delegates – District 38
Voters to choose one for Wicomico County:
{| class="wikitable"
|-
!Name
!Votes
!Percent
!Outcome
|-
|Norman H. Conway, Dem.
|18,284
|  55%
|   Won
|-
|Christopher Mills, Rep.
|14,896
|  45%
|   Lost
|}

1998 Race for Maryland House of Delegates – District 38
Voters to choose one for Worcester County:
{| class="wikitable"
|-
!Name
!Votes
!Percent
!Outcome
|-
|Bennett Bozman, Dem.
|21,155
|  66%
|   Won
|-
|Joseph Frederick Schanno, Rep.
|10,900
|  34%
|   Lost
|}

1994 Race for Maryland House of Delegates – District 38
Voters to choose three:
{| class="wikitable"
|-
!Name
!Votes
!Percent
!Outcome
|-
|Bennett Bozman, Dem.
|19,702
|  22%
|   Won
|-
|Norman H. Conway, Dem.
|17,593
|  20%
|   Won
|-
|Charles A. McClenahan, Rep.
|16,700
|  19%
|   Won
|-
|Charles A. Bruce Jr., Dem.
|12,591
|  14%
|   Lost
|-
|Christopher E. Mills, Rep.
|12,296
|  14%
|   Lost
|-
|Ronald L. Bireley, Rep.
|10,570
|  12%
|   Lost
|}

References and notes

External links
HOUSE OF DELEGATES/FORMER DELEGATES:Charles A. McClenahan, State Delegate

1941 births
2017 deaths
Republican Party members of the Maryland House of Delegates
Politicians from Wilmington, North Carolina
People from Crisfield, Maryland